Linda Gibboney (born March 7, 1951 in New York City, New York) is an American actress, best known for her roles on soap operas and serials.  These roles included "Sybil Thorne, R. N." on All My Children (1979–1981) and "Jenny Deacon Kendall' on Search for Tomorrow (1982–1983). Serial roles include Gina Blake DeMott Capwell Timmons Lockridge on Santa Barbara (1984–1985), and "Jessica Gardner" on Generations (1989–1991).  She was also on an episode of Married... with Children.
She won a Soap Opera Award for her role as Gina Capwell, but was  replaced by Robin Mattson.

She is now a college professor at UCLA.

Filmography
Married... with Children as Miss McGowen Teacher’s Pets (1 episode, 1992)
Generations (1989) TV series as Jessica Gardner #2 (unknown episodes, 1989–1991)
Doogie Howser, M.D. as Mrs. Iger (1 episode, 1989)
Highway to Heaven as Mother (1 episode, 1988)
Dynasty as Maid (1 episode, 1986)
Santa Barbara as Gina Blake Lockridge (various episodes, 1984–1985)
Search for Tomorrow (1951) TV series as Jenny Deacon (unknown episodes, 1982–1984)
All My Children as Sybil Thorne (various episodes, 1979–1981)
Alien Zone (1978) (as Kathie Gibboney) as Julie
The Brady Bunch (as Kathie Gibboney) as Linda (1 episode, 1973)

External links
 

1951 births
Living people
Actresses from New York City
American television actresses
American film actresses
American soap opera actresses
20th-century American actresses
21st-century American women